Lazarus (Original Cast Recording) is an album by the New York cast of the musical Lazarus, which was written by David Bowie and Enda Walsh, with music by David Bowie – orchestrated by Henry Hey. The album was released on 21 October 2016. The album includes three previously unreleased songs by Bowie, "No Plan", "Killing a Little Time" and "When I Met You". The album was scheduled and recorded on 11 January 2016, which turned out to be the day after Bowie's death. The musicians and cast were notified upon arriving at the studio; their emotional performances are captured on the recording.  This album was produced by David Bowie and Henry Hey and recorded and mixed by Kevin Killen.

Track listing

Personnel
Cast
Michael C. Hall as Thomas Jerome Newton
Cristin Milioti as Newton's assistant, Elly
Michael Esper as Valentine
Charlie Pollock as Michael
Sophia Anne Caruso as Girl (aka Newton's muse)
Bobby Moreno as Zach
Lynn Craig as Maemi
Nicholas Christopher as Ben
Krystina Alabado as Teenage Girl #1
Krista Pioppi as Teenage Girl #2
Brynn Williams as Teenage Girl #3

Band
Henry Hey – orchestrator, musical director, pianist
Chris McQueen – guitar 1
JJ Appleton – guitar 2
Brian Delaney – drums
Fima Ephron – bass
Lucas Dodd – saxophones
Karl Lyden – trombones

Charts

Release history

References

2016 soundtrack albums
David Bowie soundtracks
RCA Records soundtracks
Columbia Records soundtracks
Sony Music soundtracks
Albums produced by David Bowie